Battle of Aberdeen may refer to:

 Battle of Aberdeen (1644), an engagement in the Wars of the Three Kingdoms
 Battle of Aberdeen (1646), fought on 14 May 1646 during the Scottish Civil War
 Battle of Aberdeen (Andaman Islands), fought on May 17, 1859 between the Andamanese Scheduled Tribe and the British in Northwest Port Blair, South Andaman Island, one of the Andaman Islands

See also 
 Aberdeen (disambiguation)